Adscita krymensis is a moth of the family Zygaenidae. It is only known from the Crimea

The length of the forewings is about 11.5 mm for males.

References

C. M. Naumann, W. G. Tremewan: The Western Palaearctic Zygaenidae. Apollo Books, Stenstrup 1999, 

Procridinae
Moths described in 1994
Moths of Europe